On 27 December 1963, Moi-e-Muqqadas, a holy relic believed by many to be a strand from the beard of prophet Muhammad, went missing the Hazratbal Shrine in Jammu and Kashmir, leading to widespread protests across the Indian subcontinent.

The relic was recovered on 4January 1964.

History of the relic 

The relic was brought to India in 1635 by Syed Abdullah. It was then passed through his son Syed Hamid to a Kashmiri businessman named Nooruddin. In the late 17th century, the Mughal emperor Aurangzeb imprisoned Nooruddin and seized the relic, moving it to the Sufi tomb in Ajmer. Aurangzeb returned the relic in 1700 after Nooruddin had died. The relic was preserved by his descendants and kept in a place that later became the Hazratbal Shrine.

Theft 
On 27 December 1963, news broke out that the holy relic was stolen from the shrine. Around 50,000 people carrying black flags demonstrated in front of the shrine. According to The Times of India, the Srinagar superintendent of police said that he believed that the theft had occurred around 2am when the custodians of the shrine were sleeping.

The next day, the Chief  Minister of the state, Khwaja Shams-ud-Din, reached the shrine and announced an award of 100,000 rupees for providing information regarding the theft. On 29December, a curfew was imposed and police arrested the Congress leader Mohammad Shafi Qureshi. To investigate the theft, on 31December, Indian Prime Minister Jawaharlal Nehru sent the head of the Central Bureau of Investigation, B. N. Mullick, to Kashmir. Mirwaiz Maulvi Farooq set up the Sacred Relic Action Committee, of which he was the president.

On 4 January 1964, the relic was recovered, and the Sadr-i-Riyasat Karan Singh organised prayers at a Hindu temple to help dispel communal tension. The relic was inspected and identified by Sayyid Meerak Shah Kashani as being genuine. Shah Kashani said he had seen the relic many times and could easily identify it.

Sayyid Meerak recited a poem: 
The Garden is bright with the light of Muhammad
The light of Muhammad is reflected in every flower and every plant.

When Mullick informed Nehru about the recovery, Nehru said to Mullick that "you have saved Kashmir for India". In his memoirs, Mullick claims that the information about the investigation was not disclosed. The Home Minister of India, Gulzarilal Nanda, also said in the parliament that the thieves "shall be identified".

On 17 January 1964, he named the three people who were arrested for the theft. They included three Kashmiri Muslims namely, Abdul Rahim Bandey, Abdul Rashid and Kadir Butt. The latter was believed to have affiliations with the Pakistan, Nanda said.

Aftermath 
Identification by its caretakers and other investigation made by the Government of Jammu and Kashmir (law and order), special identification team says its authenticity is indeed original. Post identification, a public deedar (view) of the Holy relic was organized on 6 February coinciding with the anniversary of martyrdom of the fourth Caliph of Islam, Ali bin Abu Talib.

The incident led to riots in the Indian state of West Bengal and East Pakistan. There was a huge refugee influx in a small time frame of three months period between December 1963 and February 1964 to India as a result of these riots.

A fictionalized version of the incident is the subject of Salman Rushdie's short story "The Prophet's Hair" (1981).

References 

Theft
Relics
1963 in India
Jammu and Kashmir
1963 crimes in India
Crime in Jammu and Kashmir